Open Camera is an Android application published under the free software license GPL v3.0 or later.

Features
Features include:
 "Auto-leveling" photographs,
 Remote photo taking using sound-based activation,
 Changing photo and video file name prefixes,
 Image and video quality and format options,
 Custom Exif tags,
 Customisable photo stamping,
 Exposure locking,
 A variety of photo modes (STD, DRO, HDR, PANO, EXPO {}),
 Flash photography, including the use of screen flashes for front-facing camera photographs,
 Setting a maximum duration limit for videos

Requirements
Open Camera requires Android 4.0.3 or later.

References

External links 
 

Android (operating system) software
Free software